Eni Plenitude S.p.A. Società Benefit (formerly: Eni gas e luce S.p.A. Società Benefit) is an Italian company 100% controlled by Eni S.p.A. active in the sale and marketing of gas and electricity for households and businesses, the production of renewable energy and the management of charging points for electric vehicles.

Eni gas e luce was created on 1 July 2017 following the transformation of the previous Gas&Power division into a new retail company for gas and electricity under the management and control of Eni. Stefano Goberti has been the CEO of the company since 5 November 2021.

The company is part of the Eni group, which was founded by Enrico Mattei in 1953 with the name Ente Nazionale Idrocarburi and which in the nineties, when the public monopoly on the energy market ceased, became a joint-stock company. Today Eni operates not only in the protected market, but also in the Free Energy Market in Italy. In July 2021, Eni gas e luce updated its corporate bylaws in Benefit Company, becoming the first major company in the energy sector in Italy to adopt this term.

On 22 November 2021, Eni presented, during the Capital Markets Day event on the Milan Stock Exchange, a new company that combines production from renewables, the sale of energy and energy services and a network of charging points for electric vehicles: in March 2022, Eni gas e luce changed its name to Plenitude.

Activity 
In 2019 Eni gas e luce acquired the majority stake in the company SEA S.p.A. opening up to the energy requalification sector of buildings, especially for industrial buildings and condominiums. In August Eni gas e luce became the first company among energy companies to be registered in the Registro Unico degli Intermediari Assicurativi, as an insurance intermediary, receiving the mandate from the Zurich company. In the same year, in October, it launched the new E-Start service, proposing charging solutions for electric vehicles and entering the sustainable mobility market.

In January 2020, it acquired 70% of the Evolvere company, which operates in the sales, installation and maintenance of photovoltaic systems. In the August of the following year, the company acquires 100% of Be Power S.p.A., that controls the second largest charging network for electric vehicles in Italy through its subsidiary BeCharge.

In September 2022 the newly renamed company Eni Plenitude acquired a 65% stake in Hergo Renewables S.P.A., a company that holds a portfolio of projects in Italy and Spain with a total capacity of approximately 1.5GW.

Presence 
Plenitude operates in Italy in the cities of Milan, Bologna, Vicenza, Padua, Treviso, Parma and Genoa with authorized points of sale and is active throughout the country with a network of nearly 150 franchised stores. The company also operates in the countries of France, Greece and Slovenia through subsidiaries with a total of 10 million customers served and over 2,000 employees. Plenitude also has several projects for the generation of renewable energy in Italy, France, Spain, Norway, UK, United States, Kazakhstan and Australia.

See also 
 Eni

References

External links
 

Eni